Morality police may refer to:
Islamic religious police
Moral police
Vice squad